Dimas Delgado Morgado (born 6 February 1983), known simply as Dimas, is a Spanish professional footballer who plays as a midfielder for CF Montañesa.

Club career

Born in Santa Coloma de Gramanet, Barcelona, Catalonia, Dimas was a product of local UDA Gramenet. In 2006, he moved to FC Barcelona's reserves, helping them return to the Segunda División B in his second season.

For the 2008–09 campaign, Dimas joined CD Numancia for his La Liga debut, which occurred on 25 September 2008 in a 2–0 away loss against RCD Mallorca. He was regularly played as the Soria club was eventually relegated after just one year.

Dimas competed in the Segunda División from 2009 to 2015, dropping down a level with FC Cartagena and Recreativo de Huelva. On 3 August 2015, aged 32, he moved abroad for the first time, signing a one-year deal with A-League side Western Sydney Wanderers FC and sharing teams with countrymen Alberto and Andreu.

On 11 July 2017, Dimas joined Bengaluru FC on a one-year contract. After a successful debut season in the Indian Super League, he agreed to a one-year extension.

Club statistics

Honours
Bengaluru
Indian Super League: 2018–19

References

External links

1983 births
Living people
People from Santa Coloma de Gramenet
Sportspeople from the Province of Barcelona
Spanish footballers
Footballers from Catalonia
Association football midfielders
La Liga players
Segunda División players
Segunda División B players
Tercera División players
Tercera Federación players
UDA Gramenet footballers
FC Barcelona Atlètic players
CD Numancia players
FC Cartagena footballers
Recreativo de Huelva players
CF Montañesa players
A-League Men players
Western Sydney Wanderers FC players
Indian Super League players
Bengaluru FC players
Spanish expatriate footballers
Expatriate soccer players in Australia
Expatriate footballers in India
Spanish expatriate sportspeople in Australia
Spanish expatriate sportspeople in India